The One-Handed Trick is a 2008 Spanish film directed by Santiago A. Zannou, which stars  alongside Ovono Candela.

Plot 
The plot follows the attempts of two friends, Adolfo (hooked on heroin) and El Cuajo (a disabled man), of setting up a hip hop recording studio.

Cast

Production 
The One-Handed Trick was produced by Media Films, and it had the participation of TVE. Filming took place in locations belonging to the outskirts of Barcelona, including .

Release 
The film screened at the San Sebastián International Film Festival in September 2008. It was theatrically released in Spain on 16 January 2009.

Reception 
Mirito Torreiro of Fotogramas rated the film 4 out of 5 stars, highlighting "Zannou's rigor in building the story" as the best thing about the film, while citing a degree of "obviousness in the drawing of some characters" as a negative point.

Jonathan Holland of Variety considered that the film——"a too-rare incursion by Spanish film into the coarse realities of multiculturalism on its cities' outskirts"—features "a crudely makeshift feel that suits its subject".

Irene Crespo of Cinemanía rated it 3 out of 5 stars, considering that Zannou, "with few resources, without professional actors, but with a lot of enthusiasm, and at a rap rhythm", managed to craft "an undeceptive portrait of the reality of any city's slums"

Accolades 

|-
| align = "center" rowspan = "3" | 2009 || rowspan = "3" | 23rd Goya Awards || Best New Director || Santiago A. Zannou ||  || rowspan = "3" | 
|-
| Best New Actor || Juan Manuel Montilla "Langui" || 
|-
| Best Original Song || Woulfrank Zannou, Juan Manuel Montilla "Langui" || 
|}

See also 
 List of Spanish films of 2009

References 

Films shot in Catalonia
Spanish drama films
2008 drama films
2000s Spanish-language films
2000s hip hop films
2000s Spanish films